Allied bombing of the oil campaign targets of World War II included attacks on Nazi Germany oil refineries, synthetic oil plants, storage depots, and other chemical works.   Natural oil was available in Northwestern Germany at Nienhagen (55%—300,000 tons per year), Rietberg (20%—300,000), and Heide (300,000) and refineries were mainly at Hamburg and Hannover.  Refineries in France, Holland, and Italy (54)—mainly coastal plants for ocean-shipped crude—were within Allied bombing range and generally unused by Germany (Italian refining ceased in August 1943).  Even before the war, Germany was dependent on foreign sources for an adequate supply of oil.  The annexations of Austria and the Sudetenland (and the breakup of Czechoslovakia); the "campaigns in Norway, Holland, Belgium, and France…and imports from the Soviet Union provided significant wartime POL imports to Nazi Germany.  Firms that operated oil facilities included Deutsche Erdöl-Aktiengesellschaft, Brabag (e.g., Böhlen, Magdeburg/Rothensee, Zeitz), Fanto (Pardubice, Budapest), and I.G. Farbenindustrie (Blechhammer, Ludwigshafen/Oppau, Oświęcim).

References
:  Part 10 of the Plan for Completion of the Combined Bomber Offensive identifies plants at both .

Oil refinery targets